See also knapsack (disambiguation)

Knapsack was an American rock band formed in 1993 by Blair Shehan (vocals/guitar) and Colby Mancasola (drums). Shehan and Mancasola were two high school friends studying at the University of California, Davis. Guitarist Jason Bokros and bass guitarist Rod Meyer completed the line-up.

In 1994, the band recorded a single for the independent label Goldenrod Records and signed with Alias Records later that year. Their first album, Silver Sweepstakes, was released in 1995. They then toured extensively playing with bands such as Pavement, Rocket from the Crypt, Jawbox and Drive Like Jehu.

Bokros left the group before the release of their second album, Day Three of My New Life, in 1997. Rod Meyer left the group after this release and was replaced by Sergie Loobkoff of Samiam. Their third album, This Conversation is Ending Starting Right Now, was released in 1998. Shehan went on to form The Jealous Sound after the band broke up in 2000.

Knapsack reunited in fall 2013 to mark the 15th anniversary of their final US tour. The band played several shows, including a stop at the Fest, in Gainesville, Florida, making this their first-ever Florida appearance. However, according to Blair Shehan, and Groezrock festival in Belgium in 2015, Knapsack has no plans to release new music.

Knapsack reunited again in 2015 to perform as an opening act for Coheed and Cambria on the tour for their album The Color Before the Sun in Seattle, Washington, and Portland, Oregon.

Discography
Albums
 Silver Sweepstakes (1995)
 Day Three of My New Life (1997)
 This Conversation Is Ending Starting Right Now (1998)

Singles
 "Trainwrecker" (1994)
 "True To Form" (1995)
 "Dropkick" w/ Stuntman (1997)

Compilations
 Superwinners Summer Rock Academy (1996)
 Don't Forget to Breathe (1996)

Music videos
 "Cellophane" (1995)
 "Effortless" (1995)
 "Thursday Side of the Street" (1997)

References

Musical groups from Davis, California
American emo musical groups
Indie rock musical groups from California
Pop punk groups from California
Musical groups established in 1993
Musical groups disestablished in 2000
1993 establishments in California